The Weld Valley is a valley located in southern Tasmania. It is an area of aboriginal cultural heritage and natural history within the Tasmanian Wilderness World Heritage Area.

River
The Weld River flows from its source near Lake Gordon to its confluence with the Huon River on the Arve Plains. The river descends  over its  course.

Caves
The Weld Valley is home to a number of archaeological caves which contain evidence of human use dating back to at least 20,000 years ago. Bone Cave approximately is 29,000 years old.

See also

References

External links
 Huon Valley Council
 Huon Valley Environment Centre
 Huon Valley.net.au

Valleys of Tasmania
Southern Tasmania
Rivers of Tasmania